Czachowo may refer to the following places in Poland:
Czachowo, Lower Silesian Voivodeship (south-west Poland)
Czachowo, Masovian Voivodeship (east-central Poland)
Czachowo, West Pomeranian Voivodeship (north-west Poland)